The Privateer Industries Privateer is an American amphibious amateur-built aircraft that was designed by John Meekins and Bill Husa and is under development by Privateer Industries of Florida. It was first flown on 6 August 2018. The aircraft is intended to be supplied as a kit for amateur construction and later type certified and sold as a complete ready-to-fly-aircraft.

Development
The design was conceived by Meekins, who sought an amphibious aircraft design, but found all existing ones had safety and performance issues and thus fell short of his personal requirements. As a result, he designed his own aircraft. Meekins enlisted assistance from Bill Husa of Orion Technologies in Scottsdale, Arizona and made him chief engineer to work on the design and build the prototype, although Husa died in 2012, before the prototype was completed. Meekins had Embry Riddle Aeronautical University review the design and they reported favorably on it. Meekins established Privateer Industries to manufacture the design and remains chairman & CEO of the company. The development of the aircraft to first flight took over ten years.

Design
The Privateer features a cantilever low-wing, a seven-seat enclosed cabin accessed by doors, retractable tricycle landing gear, as well as fixed floats for water operation, a twin boom tail mounted on the floats, and a single engine in pusher configuration.

The aircraft is made from carbon fiber composites. Its  span wing is mounted low on the fuselage, which also attaches the integral fixed floats. The aft end of the floats acts as twin tail booms for the twin tail fins, with a single tailplane and elevator mounted high above the pusher propeller. The standard engine used is the Walter M601 turboprop, which produces  for take-off and  continuous. The propeller employs a shroud to increase thrust and reduce noise.

Operational history
By August 2018, one example, the prototype, had been registered in the United States with the Federal Aviation Administration.

Specifications (Privateer prototype)

See also
List of flying boats and floatplanes

References

External links

Privateer Industries aircraft
2010s United States sport aircraft
2010s United States civil utility aircraft
Single-engined pusher aircraft
Low-wing aircraft
Homebuilt aircraft
Aircraft first flown in 2018
Twin-boom aircraft